Congress created the Dome Wilderness in New Mexico in 1980. The wilderness area borders the Bandelier Wilderness in Bandelier National Monument.

The Dome Wilderness is easily accessible from Los Alamos, New Mexico, by paved and gravel roads.  There are several trailheads on the national forest and some trails extend into the national monument, allowing for long loop hikes. Like the rest of the Santa Fe National Forest, the wilderness area has many prehistoric sites.

Because a fire destroyed much of the Dome Wilderness in 1996, the stark landscape stands out in contrast to other parts of the forest. The highest point in the wilderness area is near St. Peter's Dome.

References

Wilderness areas of New Mexico
Santa Fe National Forest
Jemez Mountains
Protected areas of Sandoval County, New Mexico
IUCN Category Ib
Protected areas established in 1980
1980 establishments in New Mexico